Flowers of Reverie is a 1984 Hungarian drama film directed by László Lugossy. It was entered into the 35th Berlin International Film Festival where it won the Silver Bear - Special Jury Prize.

Cast
 György Cserhalmi as Majláth Ferenc, huszárfõhadnagy
 Grażyna Szapołowska as Mária, Majláth felesége
 Jiří Adamíra as Heinrich nagybácsi
 Bogusław Linda as Tarnóczy Kornél
 Péter Malcsiner as Tarnóczy Miklós
 Lajos Öze as Ezredes (as Õze Lajos)
 Angéla Császár as Mária magyar hangja (voice)
 Tibor Kristóf as Heinrich magyar hangja (voice)
 Sándor Szakácsi as Kornél magyar hangja (voice)
 Vilmos Kun as Börtönigazgató
 Mátyás Usztics as Rendõrparancsnok
 Kati Marton as Dada (as Marton Katalin)
 Frigyes Hollósi as Head Physician of Madhouse

References

External links

1984 films
1980s Hungarian-language films
1984 drama films
Films directed by László Lugossy
Silver Bear Grand Jury Prize winners
Hungarian drama films